The Saskatoon Blades are a major junior ice hockey team playing in the Eastern Division of the Western Hockey League, formerly the Western Canadian Hockey League (WCHL). They are based in Saskatoon, Saskatchewan, playing at the 15,195-seat SaskTel Centre.

History
The Saskatoon Blades began play in 1964. The team previously played as the junior counterpart to the Saskatoon Quakers, until team owner Jim Piggott applied to the Saskatchewan Junior Hockey League (SJHL) to change the team's name and colours. The team had also been known as the Saskatoon Wesleys from 1949 to 1955. A new version of the Wesleys emerged in 1966, and along with the Saskatoon Quakers as they joined the North Saskatchewan Junior B Hockey League. In 1968, the Saskatoon Olympics, a Junior A franchise, was established in Saskatoon and became the main development affiliate for the Saskatoon Blades.

For the 1966–67 season, the team transferred to the new Canadian Major Junior Hockey League. The WCHL renamed itself the Western Hockey League in 1978. Of the seven original WCHL franchises, the Blades are the only team to have never relocated or left the league (the Regina Pats returned to the SJHL from 1968 to 1970).

The Blades spent a number of seasons at the original Saskatoon Arena and there, developed many of the top professional players and coaches of their day, such as Bernie Federko, Wendel Clark, Mike Babcock. In the early 1990s, the team was one of the strongest in the league and made it to the league finals twice, losing to the Kamloops Blazers in both 1992 and 1994. The Blades have not returned to the final round of the playoffs since despite several successful regular seasons, including winning the Scotty Munro Memorial Trophy in 2010–11 as the regular season champions. Since then playoff success has been rare, and as of 2016 the Blades have the longest playoff drought in the CHL, having not made the playoffs since 2013. The Blades hold the distinction of having the longest championship drought in the Canadian Hockey League, having never won the WHL Championship or Memorial Cup.

The Blades were owned by the Brodsky family for 37 years.
On August 27, 2013, the team was sold to Go Auto owner Mike Priestner for a reported $9 million. Throughout their existence the team has had a fierce rivalry with the Prince Albert Raiders, although recently the team has placed more of a focus on its growing competition with Regina Pats.
 
Before the start of the 2005–06 season, the Blades retired their long-time mascot Helmutt, an anthropomorphic dog whose name was a pun on the word helmet, in favor of a mascot that would appeal to younger fans. Helmutt was replaced by Poke Check, a yeti, at the Blades home opener that season. He has since remained the team's mascot, and also appears at community events throughout Saskatoon. Just before the 2017–18 season, the team brought back the "Pac-Man" logo and jersey with the gold and royal blue colours.

Memorial Cup
The Saskatoon Blades have hosted the Memorial Cup twice in their existence. The first came in 1989, a year after the team began playing at Saskatchewan Place (now SaskTel Centre). As the host city they were allowed to play in the tournament independent of their season standing, and were joined in the competition by the WHL Champion Swift Current Broncos, OHL Champion Peterborough Petes and QMJHL Champion Laval Titan. In a surprising twist in the tournament the Blades finished first overall in the round robin with a 2–1 record, including a 5–4 victory over the Broncos, who had a 14-game undefeated streak dating back to the start of the WHL playoffs. Despite their unexpected strong performance and an automatic berth in the Cup Final, the Blades ultimately lost to the Broncos in overtime.

The Blades would again host the Memorial Cup in 2013, which included the Portland Winterhawks, London Knights and the eventual champion Halifax Mooseheads. The Blades finished the round robin with a 1–2 record (their lone win coming over the Mooseheads), and lost to the Knights in the tiebreaker. The Blades' goaltender, Andrey Makarov, won the Hap Emms Memorial Trophy as the outstanding goalie of the tournament.

Highlights
The Blades have the distinction as one of the longest running teams in Major Junior Hockey never to have won the league championship.

In the 2008–09 season, the Saskatoon Blades made history by tying a WHL record for most road wins in a single season (28) with the 1999–00 Calgary Hitmen. In that season, the Blades went on to win their first East Division Championship since 1994.

With a 5–3 win over the Brandon Wheat Kings on March 9, 2011, the Blades clinched first place in the Western Hockey League and earned themselves the Scotty Munro Memorial Trophy as the WHL's champion with the most points earned during the regular season. However, they lost out in the second round of the WHL playoffs.

During the 2012–13 season, the Blades broke a team record by winning 18 consecutive games from late January until early March.

Bruce Gordon was a forward with the Saskatoon Blades and Medicine Hat Tigers, an active hockey player who became the Saskatoon Blades captain during the beginning of the 1980s.  Gordon also coached midget hockey.  Before his passing Gordon was honoured with a Bruce Gordon banner in the SaskTel Centre, and players adorned their hockey helmets with #BeLikeBruce stickers.  Additionally at the season home opener - featuring the two teams Gordon played for, the Blades and Tigers, the "Cops for Cancer" fundraiser raised money in the name of Gordon towards cancer research.

NHL alumni
Bernie Federko is the only former Blade in the Hockey Hall of Fame.

Retired numbers
7 – Gerry Pinder
7 – Brent Ashton
10 – Brian Skrudland
12 – Bob Bourne
22 – Wendel Clark
15 – Bernie Federko

Coaches

Burns McDonald – 1964–65
George Agar – 1964–70
George Senick – 1969–70*
Jackie McLeod – 1970–79
Jerry Engele – 1979–80
Lorne Frey – 1980–81
Daryl Lubiniecki – 1981–84
Marcel Comeau – 1984–89
Terry Ruskowski – 1989–91
Bob Hoffmeyer – 1991*
Lorne Molleken – 1991–95
Donn Clark – 1995–98
Willie Desjardins – 1998*
Brad McCrimmon – 1998–2000
Kevin Dickie – 2000–04
Jamie Reeve – 2003–04*
Lorne Molleken – 2004–13
Dave Struch – 2013–14
Bob Woods – 2014–16
 Dean Brockman – 2016–18
 Mitch Love – 2018–2021
 Brennan Sonne - 2021-

*interim (regular head coach fired, sick or suspended)

Current roster
Updated January 13, 2023.

 

 
 

 
 
 
 

 

 
 

 
 

 

 

|}

Season-by-season record
Note: GP = Games played, W = Wins, L = Losses, T = Ties, OTL = Overtime losses, Pts = Points, GF = Goals for, GA = Goals against

WHL Championship history
1972–73: Loss, 2–0–3 vs Medicine Hat
1974–75: Loss, 3–4 vs New Westminster
1975–76: Loss, 1–2–4 vs New Westminster
1991–92: Loss, 3–4 vs Kamloops
1993–94: Loss, 3–4 vs Kamloops

Team records

See also
 List of ice hockey teams in Saskatchewan

References

External links

 
Sport in Saskatoon
Western Hockey League teams
Ice hockey clubs established in 1964
1964 establishments in Saskatchewan